The 2010 Major League Lacrosse season was the tenth season of the league.  The season began on May 15, 2010 and concluded with the championship game on August 22, 2010.

Milestones & events

Team movement
Chicago played as a "traveling team" in 2010 with "home games" in  Cary, NC  (WakeMed Soccer Park), Pittsburgh, PA (Joe Walton Stadium),  Albany, NY (John Fallon Field), Virginia Beach, VA (Virginia Beach Sportsplex), Rochester, NY (Marina Auto Stadium) and  Columbus, OH (Columbus Crew Stadium).

Washington renamed itself Chesapeake Bayhawks.

Toronto moved its home field from BMO Field to Lamport Stadium.

Standings 

W = Wins, L = Losses, PCT = Winning Percentage, GB = Games Back of first place, GF = Goals For, 2ptGF = 2 point Goals For, GA = Goals Against, 2ptGA = 2 point Goals Against

Final

Boston defeated Denver during the regular season 3-0 in games played.

All Star Game 
The 2010 game took place July 8 at Harvard Stadium in Boston. It  featured the MLL All Stars playing Team USA. Team USA won 13-12. Brendan Mundorf (Denver) playing for Team USA was the game's MVP.

Playoffs
The 2010 New Balance MLL Championship Weekend took place on Saturday and Sunday, August 21 and 22 at Navy–Marine Corps Memorial Stadium in Annapolis, Maryland.

Kyle Hartzell of Chesapeake was named MVP for the playoffs

Annual awards

References 

10
Major League Lacrosse